The Konjic Hydro Power Plant was a proposed hydroelectric power plant (HPP) on the Neretva river near Konjic, Bosnia and Herzegovina, and was supposed to be one of the largest HPPs in the country, with predesigned capacity of 122 MW, but project was cancelled due to organized protests by various NGO's from Bosnia and Herzegovina and abroad.

References

Cancelled hydroelectric power stations
Hydroelectric power stations in Bosnia and Herzegovina
Konjic